Jeff is a census-designated place and coal town in Perry County, Kentucky, United States. Its population was 323 as of the 2010 census.

A post office was established in the community in 1902 and named for the early settler Jefferson Combs.

Demographics

References

Census-designated places in Perry County, Kentucky
Unincorporated communities in Perry County, Kentucky
Coal towns in Kentucky
Unincorporated communities in Kentucky